The 1997 Belmont Stakes was the 129th running of the Belmont Stakes at Belmont Park in Elmont, New York held on June 7, 1997. With a field of seven horses, Touch Gold won by a quarter of a length in front of a crowd of 20,000 spectators. Silver Charm, winner of the Kentucky Derby and Preakness Stakes, had a chance to win the Triple Crown of Thoroughbred Racing by winning this race, but was unsuccessful.

Results

Times:  mile: :23.74,  mile: :49.22, mile: 1:13.81, 1 mile:  1:38.80, Final: 2:28.82

Payout schedule

See also
1997 Kentucky Derby
1997 Preakness Stakes

References

Belmont Stakes races
Belmont Stakes
Belmont Stakes
Belmont Stakes